The 2017–18 V-League Women's season was the 14th season of the V-League, the highest professional volleyball league in South Korea. The season started on 14 October 2017 and was scheduled to finish on 13 May 2018. The championship was won by Gyeongbuk Gimcheon Hi-pass.

Teams

Stadiums and locations

Personnel and sponsoring

Season standing procedure 
 Number of matches won
 Match points
 Sets ratio
 Points ratio
 Result of the last match between the tied teams

Match won 3–0 or 3–1: 3 match points for the winner, 0 match points for the loser
Match won 3–2: 2 match points for the winner, 1 match point for the loser

Regular season

League table 

Source:

1st round 

|}

2nd round 

|}

3rd round 

|}

4th round 

|}

5th round 

|}

6th round 

|}

Play-offs

Bracket

Semifinals 

|}

Finals 

|}

Final standing

References

External links
 Official website 

2017 in women's volleyball
2018 in women's volleyball
V-League (South Korea)
2017 in South Korean sport
2018 in South Korean sport